Sipti  is a village development committee in Darchula District in the Mahakali Zone of western Nepal. At the time of the 2011 Nepal census it had a population of 4,339 people living in 749 individual households.

References
https://web.archive.org/web/20130731124937/http://cbs.gov.np/wp-content/uploads/2012/11/VDC_Municipality.pdf

External links
UN map of the municipalities of Darchula District

Populated places in Darchula District